The Fokker F.VII, also known as the Fokker Trimotor, was an airliner produced in the 1920s by the Dutch aircraft manufacturer Fokker, Fokker's American subsidiary Atlantic Aircraft Corporation, and other companies under licence.

Design and development

The F.VII was designed as a single-engined transport aircraft by Walter Rethel. Five examples of this model were built for the Dutch airline KLM. One of these aircraft, registered H-NACC, was used in 1924 for the first flight from the Netherlands to the Dutch East Indies. In 1925, while living in the US, Anthony Fokker heard of the inaugural Ford Reliability Tour, which was proposed as a competition for transport aircraft. Fokker had the company's head designer, Reinhold Platz, convert a single-engined F.VIIa airliner to a trimotor configuration, powered by 200 hp Wright Whirlwind radial engines. The resulting aircraft was designated the Fokker F.VIIa/3m. Following shipment to the US, it won the Ford Reliability Tour in late 1925. The Trimotor's structure consisted of a fabric-covered steel-tube fuselage and a plywood-skinned wooden wing.

The Fokker F.VIIb/3m had a slightly increased wing area over the F.VIIa/3m, with power increased to 220 hp per engine, while the F.10 was slightly enlarged, carrying 12 passengers in an enclosed cabin. The aircraft became popularly known as the Fokker Trimotor.

Operational history
The eight- to 12-passenger Fokker was the aircraft of choice for many early airlines, both in Europe and the Americas, and it dominated the American market in the late 1920s. However, the popularity of the Fokker quickly waned after the 1931 crash of a Transcontinental & Western Air Fokker F.10, which resulted in the death of Notre Dame football coach Knute Rockne. The investigation revealed problems with the Fokker's plywood-laminate construction, resulting in a temporary ban from commercial flights, more stringent maintenance requirements, and a shift to all-metal aircraft such as the similar Ford Trimotor and later Boeing 247 and Douglas DC-2.

Pioneers and explorers
The F.VII was used by many explorers and aviation pioneers, including:
 Richard E. Byrd claimed to have flown over the North Pole in the Fokker F.VIIa/3m Josephine Ford (N267) on 9 May 1926, a few days before Roald Amundsen accomplished the feat in the airship Norge.
 Lester Maitland and Albert Hegenberger, two lieutenants of the United States Army Air Corps, made the first transpacific flight from the continental United States to Hawaii (c. 2,400 mi/3,862 km) in the Atlantic-Fokker C-2 Bird of Paradise on 28–29 June 1927. 
 Richard E. Byrd, Bernt Balchen and two others flew the first official transatlantic airmail in the civilian-owned C-2 America (NX206), crash-landing off the coast of France on 1 July 1927.
 Lieutenant Colonel 'Dan' Minchin, Captain Leslie Hamilton and Princess Anne of Löwenstein-Wertheim-Freudenberg attempted on 31 August 1927 to become the first aviators to cross the Atlantic from east to west using a Fokker F.VIIa named St. Raphael (G-EBTQ). Their fate remains unknown.
 James DeWitt Hill and Lloyd W. Bertaud made a failed attempt to fly from Old Orchard Beach, Maine, to Rome in the F.VIIa Old Glory (NX703) on 6 September 1927, but they and the aircraft were lost in the North Atlantic the following day.
 Sir Charles Kingsford Smith's F.VIIb/3m Southern Cross was the first aircraft to cross the Pacific from the United States to Australia in June 1928, and the first to cross the Tasman Sea, flying from Australia to New Zealand and back in September of that year.
 Amelia Earhart became the first woman to fly across the Atlantic on 17 June 1928, as a passenger aboard the Fokker F.VIIb/3m Friendship (NX4204).
 A group of U. S. Army Air Corps flyers, led by then-Major Carl Spaatz, set an endurance record of over 150 hours with the Question Mark, a Fokker C-2A over Los Angeles on 1 to 7 January 1929. The purpose of this mission was to set a flight endurance record using aerial refueling.

Variants
F.VII Single-engined transport aircraft, powered by a  Rolls-Royce Eagle or  Napier Lion engine, accommodation for two crew and eight passengers; five built. One converted to use  Bristol Jupiter and two to use  Gnome-Rhône Jupiter VI engine.
F.VIIa (F.VIIa/1m) Single-engined transport aircraft, slightly larger than F.VII with new undercarriage and wing. Flown on 12 March 1925. First aircraft had a  V-12 Packard Liberty engine, but a further 39 F.VIIa examples had mostly radial Bristol Jupiter or Pratt & Whitney Wasp engines.
F.VIIa/3m Version with two additional underwing engines, flown on 4 September 1925. The first two aircraft were otherwise identical to the F.VIIa. From the third aircraft, the fuselage was 31 in (80 cm) longer and was powered by 200 hp (149 kW) Wright J-4 Whirlwind radial engines. Probably only 18 were built, while many F.VIIa were upgraded to the F.VIIa/3m standard.
F.VIIb/3m Main production version with greater span; 154 built, including those built under licence.
F-9 American-built version of the Fokker F.VIIb/3m; built by the Atlantic Aircraft Corporation in the United States.
F-10 Enlarged version of the Fokker F.VII airliner, able to carry up to 12 passengers; built by the Atlantic Aircraft Corporation in the United States.
C-2 Military transport version of the Fokker F.9, powered by three 220 hp (164 kW) Wright J-5 radial piston engines, accommodation for two pilots and ten passengers; three built in 1926 for the US Army Air Corps.
C-2A Military transport version for the US Army Air Corps, with greater wingspan, powered by three 220 hp (164 kW) Wright J-5 radial piston engines, accommodation for two pilots and ten passengers; eight built in 1928.
XC-7 One C-2A fitted with three 330 hp (246 kW) Wright J-6-9 radial piston engines. Redesignated C-7 when four C-2A examples were similarly reconfigured.
C-7 Military transport conversion of C-2A for the US Army Air Corps by re-engining with 300 hp (220 kW) Wright R-975 engines. XC-7 prototype and four C-2As redesignated in 1931. 
C-7A Six new production C-7 (Wright R-975) aircraft with larger wings, new vertical fin design, and fuselages patterned after the commercial F.10A.
XLB-2 Experimental light bomber version of the C-7, powered by three 410 hp (306 kW) Pratt & Whitney R-1380 radial piston engines; one built.
TA-1 Military transport version of the US Navy and Marine Corps; three built.
TA-2 Military transport version for the US Navy; three built.
TA-3 Military transport version for the US Navy, powered by three Wright J-6 radial piston engines; one built.
RA-1 Redesignation of the TA-1.
RA-2 Redesignation of the TA-2.
RA-3 Redesignation of the TA-3.

Licensed versions
SABCA, 29 aircraft built.
Avia, 18 aircraft built.
 Three aircraft built in Italy as the IMAM Ro.10, powered by three 215 hp Alfa Romeo Lynx engines. Three built for operation by Avio Linee Italiane and Ala Littoria.
Plage i Laśkiewicz. Between 1929 and 1930, produced 11 examples of F.VIIb/3m, plus 20 of its own F.VIIb/3m bomber version (developed by Jerzy Rudlicki).
 Three aircraft built in Spain.
Avro, 14 aircraft known as Avro 618 Ten.

Operators

Civilian operators

SABENA operated 28 aircraft.

Det Danske Luftfartselskab operated three F.VIIa aircraft.

CIDNA operated seven F.VIIa aircraft.
Air Orient operated eight F.VIIb aircraft.
STAR operated one F.VIIa aircraft.

Avio Linee Italiane
Ala Littoria

Malert operated two F.VIIa aircraft.

2 F.VIIb-3ms operated by the Manchuria Aviation Company

KLM received all five F.VII aircraft and 15 F.VIIa.

Aero operated six F.VIIa aircraft for a short period in 1928. Since 1 January 1929, all aircraft were handed over to PLL LOT airline.
Polskie Linie Lotnicze LOT operated six F.VIIa and 13 F.VIIb/3m between 1929 and 1939.

Aero Portuguesa operated one F.VIIb/3m aircraft.

CFRNA

CLASSA
LAPE

Ad Astra Aero at least one F.VIIb/3m
Swissair operated one F.VIIa and eight F.VIIb/3m aircraft.

American Airways, which later became American Airlines.
TWA
Pan Am operated F.VIIb/3m aircraft.

Military operators

Belgian Air Force

Force Publique

Zrakoplovstvo Nezavisne Države Hrvatske

Czechoslovak Air Force

Ethiopian Air Force

Finnish Air Force operated one F.VIIa.

French Air Force - five F.VIIa/3m and two F.VII/3m aircraft, impressed into military service in 1939/1940.

Royal Hungarian Air Force

Regia Aeronautica

Royal Netherlands Air Force received three bomber F.VIIa/3m aircraft.

Polish Air Force operated 21 F.VIIb/3m (20 of them were licence-built) aircraft as bombers and transports between 1929 and 1939.
1 Pułk Lotniczy
211 Eskadra Bombowa
212 Eskadra Bombowa
213 Eskadra Bombowa

 Spanish Republican Air Force, operated four aircraft in the squadron of the Sahara and other two in Madrid.

United States Army Air Corps designations include Atlantic-Fokker C-2, C-5 and C-7.
United States Navy and United States Marine Corps, originally designated TA then RA

Yugoslav Royal Air Force

Accidents and incidents
On 21 June 1926, a KLM F.VII (H-NACL) force-landed at Seabrook Beach, Sandgate near Hythe, Kent, due to fuel exhaustion caused by pilot error; all five on board survived, but the aircraft was written off.
On 9 July 1926, a KLM F.VII (H-NACC) struck ground in fog at Wolvertem, Belgium, killing both pilots.
On 8 June 1927, a Fokker/Atlantic F.VIIb/3m (NC55) of Colonial Air Transport crashed on landing at Hasbrouck Heights, New Jersey; no casualties.
At 9:44pm on 31 August 1927, the oil tanker SS Josiah Macy reported the last known sighting of F.VIIa St. Raphael (G-EBTQ) on a trans-atlantic attempt from RAF Upavon, England to Ottawa, Ontario, Canada, piloted by Leslie Hamilton and Frederick F. Minchin, with Princess Anne of Löwenstein-Wertheim-Freudenberg as passenger.
On 7 September 1927, F.VIIa Old Glory (NX703) disappeared with Lloyd W. Bertaud and J. D. Hill at the controls, in an attempted transatlantic flight from Old Orchard Beach, Maine to Rome, Italy. The flight's last known location was in the North Atlantic, 960 km East of Cape Race, Newfoundland.
On 17 September 1927, a Reynolds Airways F.VII (C776) crashed at Dunellen, New Jersey, due to loss of control following engine failure, killing seven of 12 on board. The aircraft was formerly operated by KLM, and had been imported to the United States.
On 4 July 1928, Belgian financier Alfred Lowenstein disappeared during a flight over the English Channel as a passenger in Fokker F.VII/3m (G-EBYI), in unknown circumstances.
On 15 August 1928, a Pan Am F.VIIa/3m, General Machado (NC53) ditched in the Gulf of Mexico off Egmont Key, Florida.
On 4 July 1929, a Fokker F.VIIa/3m (G-EBYI) force landed near Mongalla, Sudan. Owner and pilot was Donald H Drew, three passengers included Glen Kidston, no casualties. Aircraft damaged beyond repair.
On 11 September 1930, a Sabena F.VII (OO-AIN) crashed on climbout from Croydon Airport due to an in-flight fire, killing both pilots.
On 30 October 1930, a Fokker F.VIIb/3m (CH-161) of Balair struck a chimney, and crashed in fog on approach to Essen/Mülheim Airport; three crew injured, three passengers unhurt. See also Commons Category:Fokker F.VIIb/3m of Balair
On 6 December 1931, a KLM F.VIIb/3m (PH-AFO) crashed at Bangkok after failing to take off, killing five of seven on board.
On 3 April 1940, a BOAC Avro 618 Ten (G-AASP, Hercules) crashed on takeoff from Cairo; there were no casualties, but the aircraft was written off.

Specifications (F.VIIb/3m)

See also

References

Notes

Bibliography
 Bowers, Peter and Ernest McDowell. Triplanes: A Pictorial History of the World's Triplanes and Multiplanes.  St. Paul, Minnesota: Motorbooks International, 1993. .
 Dierikx, Marc. Fokker: A Transatlantic Biography. Washington, DC: Smithsonian Institution Press, 1997. .

 Molson, K.M. Pioneering in Canadian Air Transport. Winnipeg: James Richardson & Sons, Ltd., 1974. .
 Nevin, David. The Pathfinders (The Epic of Flight Series). Alexandria, Virginia: Time-Life Books, 1980. .
 Postma, Thijs. Fokker: Aircraft Builders to the World. London: Jane's, 1979. .
 
 Stroud, John. European Transport Aircraft since 1910. London: Putnam, 1966.

 Weyl, A.R. Fokker: The Creative Years. London: Putnam, 1965.

F 07
1920s Dutch airliners
1920s United States airliners
Trimotors
High-wing aircraft
F.VII
Aircraft first flown in 1924
Aircraft of the Royal Netherlands East Indies Army